Marci McDonald is a Canadian journalist and author of The Armageddon Factor: The Rise of Christian Nationalism in Canada and Yankee Doodle Dandy: Brian Mulroney and the America Agenda.

She has won eight gold National Magazine Awards, Canadian Association of Journalists' investigative feature award, and the Atkinson Fellowship in Public Policy.

References

External links 
 Stephen Harper and the Theo-Cons
 Personal site

Canadian women journalists
Canadian women non-fiction writers
Living people
Year of birth missing (living people)